The Cube 2 was an ident used by BBC Two between 2 December 1967 and 28 December 1974. It featured a stylised "2" that rotated on screen.

Launch
In 1967, BBC2 was the first UK television station to launch a full colour service on the UHF frequency band, and to mark the occasion a new symbol was launched. However, there is some confusion as to when the symbol was actually launched. Some colour programming was shown in the early part of the year, before the official date of 1 July 1967, but even the official launch date was only in the main regions. It was later that year on 2 December for the full country to receive colour transmissions, and because of these different dates, it is difficult to see when this ident was introduced.

Components of the look
The ident was originally a cube with a "2" on each face, each a different colour. The ident would start by three light spots of red, green and blue, the three primary colours for television. These light spots then merge to form a white spot. Around this spot, a blue numeral "2" would form up by drawing it. The "COLOUR" legend would then appear below the 2, and the 2 would begin rotating to reveal other colour 2's, in the order blue, red, green and white. This ident would continue to rotate against the black background. The ident was formed by an animated startup and a film of a mechanical model, with the whole thing being played off a recording.

The ident was modified in early 1972 when both channels presentation were brought into line. The cubed "2" was changed so all the colours were cyan blue, with the "2" now spinning above a line with an italic "COLOUR" legend. A variety of versions were used around this period: the first being a blue 2 over a black background with white line and caption. Another version included the same as before, but with a dark blue background instead of a black one. The final version included a slightly lighter background colour and a cyan line and caption. The black background version was first to be used, which then made way for the dark blue background, with the cyan version last used, however this order is disputed. These idents were mechanical, and filmed live as required from the BBC2 NODD room and lasted as long as necessary, although the ident would usually stop spinning after a while. The colour was added electronically through the NODD process used on the BBC1 ident at the time.

Two clocks accompanied the look: the first lasted as long as the original ident and the second accompanied the mechanical idents. The first was a modified version of the last time-piece and featured to the right of the screen, a large clock face with markers at every minute mark and with Roman numerals for every five minutes. To the left, the BBC2 logo, with the legend "COLOUR" underneath and below that, usually programme information. The second clock featured a clockface in the centre of the screen with the number markers being replaced by a set of double lines that got progressively thicker the further round the clock face. The line, with the legend 'BBC2 COLOUR', now featuring the updated rounded BBC logo, was cyan in colour and located below the clock face. The clock design was identical to that used by BBC1, except for colour.

Promotions at this point were not uniform and changed depending on requirements and time of year. The holding slides used for this period featured a white, "2" logo and spot located at the bottom left of the image, with a Colour legend below the 2 and programme information to the right of the 2.

Special idents
Christmas 1967-1970 - Christmas idents were not used during this period, but Christmas slides were produced, including the cube 2 on the left of the screen (above the logo and the word "Colour") with a Christmas tree or a snowflake on the right.
Christmas 1971 - The cube 2 with coloured swirls emanating from the centre, with the font reading "Christmas" underneath.
Christmas 1972 - The cube 2 with tinsel around the edges of the screen, with the font reading "Christmas in Colour" underneath. 
Christmas 1973 - Possibly the same version as the following year; no footage exists, only photos.
Christmas 1974 - The cube 2 with all sides orange rotating and decorated with stars and a bauble where the dot usually sits; the font underneath read either "Christmas Eve", "Christmas Day" or "Boxing Day", depending on the day.

Due to lack of video recordings from this era, and due to the common broadcasting practice of wiping old tapes for reuse, very few examples survive of this era. Examples, therefore, of special idents are almost non-existent.

See also

BBC Two Launch ident
BBC Two "Striped" ident
History of BBC television idents

References

External links
TVARK: The Online Television Museum
The TV Room
MHP Ident Zone
625: Andrew Wiseman's Television Room

BBC Two
BBC Idents
Television presentation in the United Kingdom